Statistics of Lao League in the 2011 season.

Clubs 
Lao Army FC
Bank F.C.
Eastern Star Bilingual School FC
Ezra FC
Lao-American College FC
Lao Lane Xang FC
Pheuanphatthana FC
Lao Police Club (formerly Ministry of Public Security FC (MPS))
Vientiane F.C.
Yotha FC (formerly Ministry of Public Works and Transport FC)

Yotha FC were champions.

References

Lao Premier League seasons
1
Laos
Laos